Maryam Sheikh Alizadeh ( with full legal name Maryam Sheikhalizadehkhanghah; born July 18, 2004, in Tehran, Iran) is an Iranian-Azerbaijani competition swimmer, She is a member of  National Swimming Team of the Republic of Azerbaijan. She has met the 2020 Olympics qualifying time for the Women's 100 m butterfly, and represented Azerbaijan at the 2020 Summer Olympics.

Early life 
Alizadeh was born in 2004 in Tehran, Iran. When she was 11 years old, in the last competitions of the cup of martyrs viceroy of Azerbaijan on Islamic countries, held in the Tabriz, she broke 13 national records in Iran. At 2018, she was invited by the Swimming Federation of the Republic of Azerbaijan and went to Baku to continue her career in the National Swimming Team of the Republic of Azerbaijan. Maryam qualified for Tokyo 2020 on this sport after participating in various swimming competitions and Budapest international swimming competitions. She is known as the first woman to qualify for the Olympics in the history of Iranian women's swimming after 43 years.

Konya Islamic Solidarity Games 2021 
Maryam Sheikh Alizadeh won two medals in the fifth edition of the Solidarity Games of Islamic countries: silver medal in 50m butterfly and bronze medal in 100m butterfly.

Achievements 

Alizadeh took several valuable places in women's swimming after the world competitions. She won the third place in the freestyle competitions of the Slovak Republic three times within a year. Then she participated in Latvia freestyle competitions and once took second and once third place. She is now a world ranking female athlete of Swimming Federation (FINA).

References

Iranian female swimmers
Azerbaijani female swimmers
Iranian sportswomen
Living people
2004 births
Swimmers at the 2020 Summer Olympics
Olympic swimmers of Azerbaijan